Placer Theatre Ballet is a Pre-professional youth ballet company in Placer County, California, USA, that produces two full length ballet's each season.

Important people
  
 Shea Wing, Artistic Director Current

 Pat Colgate, Artistic Director 1999-2011

Performances
  
 The Nutcracker, 1999
 Alice in Wonderland, 2000
 The Nutcracker, 2000
 The Nutcracker, 2001
 Festival of Great Ballets, 2002
 The Nutcracker, 2002
 Alice in Wonderland, 2003
 The Nutcracker, 2003
 Performing Arts Center Gala, 2004
 The Nutcracker, 2004

 Snow White and the Seven Dwarfs, 2005
 The Nutcracker, 2005
 Alice in Wonderland, 2006
 The Nutcracker, 2006
 Cinderella, 2007
 The Nutcracker, 2007
 Snow White and the Seven Dwarfs, 2008
 The Nutcracker, 2008
 Alice in Wonderland, 2009
 The Nutcracker, 2009

 Cinderella, 2010
 The Nutcracker, 2010
 Coppelia, 2011
 The Nutcracker, 2011
 Snow White and the Seven Dwarfs, 2012
 The Nutcracker, 2012
 Cinderella, 2013
 The Nutcracker, 2013
 Sleeping Beauty, 2014

External links

Ballet companies in the United States
Dance in California
Placer County, California
Tourist attractions in Placer County, California
1999 establishments in California
Non-profit organizations based in California